Miss Polonia 2016 was the 39th Miss Polonia pageant, held on November 12, 2016. The winner was Izabella Krzan of Warmia-Masuria and she represented Poland in Miss Universe 2016. 2nd Runner-Up, Katarzyna Włodarek later represented Poland in Miss Universe 2017 due to the pageant taking place prior to Miss Polonia 2017. 1st Runner-Up, Dominika Szymańska represented the country in Miss Earth 2017.

Final results

Special Awards

Official Delegates

Notes

Withdrawals
 Subcarpathia
 Upper Poland
 West Pomerania
 Polish Community in Ireland
 Polish Community in Sweden

Did not compete
 Holy Cross
 Lower Silesia
 Lubusz
 Opole
 Polish Community in Argentina
 Polish Community in Australia
 Polish Community in Belarus
 Polish Community in Brazil
 Polish Community in Canada
 Polish Community in France
 Polish Community in Germany
 Polish Community in Israel
 Polish Community in Lithuania
 Polish Community in Russia
 Polish Community in South Africa
 Polish Community in the U.K.
 Polish Community in the U.S.
 Polish Community in Venezuela

References

External links
Official Website

2016
2016 beauty pageants
2016 in Poland